Platinum Tower may refer to:
 Platinum Tower (Beirut), a tower under construction in Beirut
 Platinum Tower (Dubai), a tower under construction in Dubai
 Platinum Tower (Panama City), a tower built in Panama City
 Platinum Tower (KL), a tower under construction in Kuala Lumpur